Under a Violet Moon is the second studio album by the group Blackmore's Night, released May 25, 1999. Under a Violet Moon won the New Age Voice award for the best vocal album of the year.

Track listing

Personnel
Blackmore's Night
Ritchie Blackmore – guitars, mandolin, bass, Renaissance drums, tambourine
Candice Night – vocals, pennywhistle

Guest musicians
 John Ford – vocals, bass on #07, background vocals on #01 & 10
 Miri Ben-Ari – violin on #04 & 11
 Peter Rooth – bass on #01 & 16; drum programming on #07 & 08
 Mick Cervino - additional bass on #04
 Kevin Dunne – drums
 Mike Goldberg - military drum on #03
 Adam Forgione - additional keyboards on #04
 Jens Johansson – keyboards on #01, 04, 07 & 15
 Jeff Glixman, Roy McDonald - additional keyboards
 Jason Chapman - trumpet and flugelhorn on #08
 Thomas Roth - bagpipes, backing vocals on #10
 Albert Danneman - bagpipes, backing vocals on #10
 Albrecht Schmidt-Reinthaler - harpsichord on #10
 Jost Pogrzeba - percussion on #10
 Christof Heus - trumpet on #10
 Adolf Lehnberger - trombone on #10
 Gell Spitz - trumpet on #10
 Rolf Spitz - trombone on #10
 Mark Pender - trumpet 
 Mr. & Mrs. Heller - hurdy-gurdy
 Scott Hazell, Sue Goehringer, John Gould, Trish - backing vocals

Charts

Packaging

References

Blackmore's Night albums
1999 albums
Albums produced by Jeff Glixman